KMC Music is an owner and distributor of several brands of musical instruments. The company is currently a subsidiary of Canadian corporate group Exertis | JAM.

History
The company began as Kaman Music Corporation , a part of the Kaman Corporation founded by Charles Kaman. In addition to his business interests in aviation, Kaman was a guitarist who came to explore the use of composite materials technologies in guitar building. He and his engineers created the round-backed, composite-body Ovation guitar in 1966.

In January 2008, Kaman Corporation sold  Kaman Music Corporation to Fender Musical Instruments Corporation (FMIC) for $117 million.

In 2011, Kaman Music Corporation and Musicorp, sister companies under the FMIC umbrella, united their sales and catalog divisions as KMC Musicorp.

As of 2018, Hamer has moved its facilities to China.

In 2014, FMIC sold KMC's Gretsch Drums, TOCA Percussion, Latin Percussion, KAT Percussion, Ovation Guitars, and Gibraltar Hardware brands to Drum Workshop.

In February 2015, Fender Musical Instruments Corporation sold KMC to JAM Industries, which rebranded as Exertis | JAM in 2021.

Brands 
Some of the companies that are currently subsidiaries of KMC are:

See also
 U.S. Music Corporation (also a subsidiary of Jam Industries)
 Ashly Audio (also a subsidiary of Jam Industries)

References

External links 
 
 Exertis JAM website
 NAMM.org: Oral History Library interview of Bill Kaman (2007)

American musical instrument makers
JAM Industries
Manufacturing companies based in Connecticut
Companies based in Hartford County, Connecticut
Bloomfield, Connecticut
American companies established in 1966
Manufacturing companies established in 1966
1966 establishments in Connecticut
Distribution companies of the United States